Graham Deakin (born circa 1950) is an English rock drummer, who was the main drummer for John Entwistle's touring band, Ox, from 1972 until 1977.  Deakin had a short spell with The Flys following his departure from Ox.

Deakin, who was born in Chelmsford, Essex, played a session with The Who on 21 April 1975 at Ramport Recording Studios, three days before they started recording their The Who by Numbers album.

Deakin also performed on the songs "Peg Leg Peggy", "My Wife", and "Made in Japan" on the John Entwistle album, Rigor Mortis Sets In (1973). He also performed on the soundtrack to the film Tommy (1975).

He has also featured on albums by The Moody Blues and John Lodge, as well as another Entwistle album, Mad Dog (1975). Deakin also played drums on the album, Blue Jays (1975), recorded by Justin Hayward and John Lodge.

References

Year of birth missing (living people)
Place of birth missing (living people)
Living people
British male drummers
English rock drummers
People from Chelmsford
Musicians from Essex